The King's Birthday match (from 2014-2022, the Queen's Birthday match) is held annually on the King's Birthday Holiday in Australia between the Canterbury-Bankstown Bulldogs and the St. George Illawarra Dragons or Parramatta Eels. It is traditionally played at Stadium Australia. The Canterbury-Bankstown Bulldogs won the first three clashes, but St. George Illawarra won the following two. The Canterbury-Bankstown Bulldogs however won the two following encounters. The game was the first of two on the holiday when it started, but due to the scrapping of Monday night football it is now the centrepiece event on the King's Birthday Holiday. The match traditionally kicks off at 4pm. The game is the centrepiece of the long weekend's big lineup each year.

In 2020, due to the COVID-19 pandemic, the match was moved to Bankwest Stadium and played behind closed doors.

Head to Head

Canterbury-Bankstown  v St George Illawarra (2015-2021)

Canterbury-Bankstown  v Parramatta (2022-Present)

Results

2015

2016

2017

2018

2019

2020

2021

2022

2023

See also

 Rivalries in the National Rugby League
 King's Birthday match (AFL)

References

External links

Canterbury-Bankstown Bulldogs
St. George Illawarra Dragons
Rugby league competitions in New South Wales
Rugby league in Sydney
Rugby league rivalries
2015 establishments in Australia
Recurring sporting events established in 2015
Sports rivalries in Australia
National Rugby League